Killester College is an independent Roman Catholic secondary day school for girls, located in the Melbourne suburb of Springvale, Victoria, Australia. Killester was founded by the Brigidine Sisters. Today, Killester College works under the governance of the Kildare Ministries following Brigidine tradition. The school was established in 1955 and in 2020 had a staff of 139 made up of 99 teachers and 40 support staff.

Notable alumni 

 Anne Ferguson graduated Class of 1977 at Killester. She is the second female, Supreme Court Chief Justice of Victoria. The first Supreme Court Chief Justice of Victoria, Marilyn Warren, graduated at Kilbreda, sister school of Killester, also under the governance of the Brigidine Sisters.

See also

 List of non-government schools in Victoria
 Victorian Certificate of Education
 Vocational Education and Training
 Victorian Certificate of Applied Learning

References

External links
 Killester College website

Educational institutions established in 1955
Girls' schools in Victoria (Australia)
1955 establishments in Australia
Brigidine schools
Catholic secondary schools in Melbourne
Buildings and structures in the City of Greater Dandenong